Naji Salim Hussain al-Ali (born c. 1938 – 29 August 1987) was a Palestinian cartoonist, noted for the political criticism of  the Arab regimes and Israel in his works. He has been described as the greatest Palestinian cartoonist and probably the best-known cartoonist in the Arab world.

He is best known as the creator of the character Handala, pictured in his cartoons as a young witness of the satirized policy or event depicted, and who has since become an icon of Palestinian defiance. He drew over 40,000 cartoons, which often reflected Palestinian and Arab public opinion and were sharply critical commentaries on Palestinian and Arab politics and political leaders. On 22 July 1987, while outside the London offices of al-Qabas, a Kuwaiti newspaper for which he drew political caricatures, al-Ali was shot in the neck and mortally wounded. Naji al-Ali died five weeks later in Charing Cross Hospital.

Early life
Naji al-Ali was born in 1938 or thereabouts in the northern Palestinian village of Al-Shajara, located between Tiberias and Nazareth (now subsumed by Ilaniya). He lived as an exile in the south of Lebanon with his family after the 1948 Palestinian exodus, the Nakba, and lived in Ain al-Hilweh refugee camp near Sidon, where he attended the Union of Christian Churches school. After graduation, he worked in the orchards of Sidon, then moved to Tripoli where he attended the White Friars' vocational school for two years.

Naji al-Ali then moved to Beirut, where he lived in a tent in Shatila refugee camp and worked in various industrial jobs. In 1957, after qualifying as a car mechanic, he travelled to Saudi Arabia, where he worked for two years.

Career as a cartoonist and journalist
In 1959 Naji al-Ali returned to Lebanon, and that year he joined the Arab Nationalist Movement (ANM), but was expelled four times within one year for lack of party discipline. Between 1960 and 1961, along with comrades from the ANM, he published a handwritten political journal Al-Sarkha ('the scream').

In 1960, he entered the Lebanese Academy of Fine Arts, but was unable to continue his studies there as he was imprisoned for political reasons soon afterwards. After his release he moved to Tyre, where he worked as a drawing instructor in the Ja'fariya College.

The writer and political activist Ghassan Kanafani saw some of Naji al-Ali's cartoons on a visit to Ain al-Hilweh and printed the artist's first published drawings along with an accompanying article in Al-Hurriya'''s issue numbered 88 dated 25 September 1961.

In 1963 Naji al-Ali moved to Kuwait, hoping to save money to study art in Cairo or Rome. There he worked as an editor, cartoonist, designer and newspaper producer on the Arab nationalist Al Tali'a magazine. From 1968 on he worked for Al-Siyasa. In the course of these years he returned to Lebanon several times. In 1974 he started working for the Lebanese newspaper Al-Safir, which permitted him to return to Lebanon for a longer period. During the Israeli invasion of Lebanon in 1982, he was briefly detained by the occupying forces along with other residents of Ain al-Hilweh. In 1983 he once more moved to Kuwait to work for Al Qabas and in 1985 moved to London where he worked for its international edition until his death.

In 1984 he was described by The Guardian as "the nearest thing there is to an Arab public opinion".

Work, positions and awards
In his career as a political cartoonist, Naji al-Ali produced over 40,000 drawings. They generally deal with the situation of the Palestinian people, depicting suffering and resistance and harshly criticizing the Israeli state and Israeli occupation, Palestinian leadership, and the Arab regimes. Naji al-Ali was a fierce opponent of any settlement that would not vindicate the Palestinian people's right to all of historic Palestine, and many of his cartoons express this position. Unlike many political cartoonists, specific politicians do not appear in person in his work: as he stated, "... I have a class outlook, that is why my cartoons take this form. What is important is drawing situations and realities, not drawing presidents and leaders."

Naji al-Ali published three books of his cartoons, in 1976, 1983 and 1985, and was preparing another at the time of his death.

In 1979, Naji al-Ali was elected president of the League of Arab Cartoonists. In 1979 and 1980, he received the first prize in the Arab cartoonists exhibitions held in Damascus. The International Federation of Newspaper Publishers awarded him the "Golden Pen of Freedom" posthumously in 1988.

Handala

Handala, also known as Handhala, is the most famous of Naji al-Ali's characters.
He is depicted as a ten-year-old boy, and appeared for the first time in Al-Siyasa in Kuwait in 1969.
The figure turned his back to the viewer from the year 1973, and clasped his hands behind his back.
The artist explained that the ten-year-old represented his age when forced to leave Palestine and would not grow up until he could return to his homeland; his turned back and clasped hands symbolised the character's rejection of "outside solutions". Handala wears ragged clothes and is barefoot, symbolising his allegiance to the poor. In later cartoons, he is actively participating in the action depicted not merely observing it. The artist vows that his figure, Handala  will “reveal his face to the readers again only when Palestinian refugees return to their homeland”.

Handala became the signature of Naji al-Ali's cartoons and remains an iconic symbol of Palestinian identity and defiance. Handala has also been used as the web mascot of the Iranian green movement. The artist remarked that "He was the arrow of the compass, pointing steadily towards Palestine. Not just Palestine in geographical terms, but Palestine in its humanitarian sense—the symbol of a just cause, whether it is located in Egypt, Vietnam or South Africa."

Other characters and motifs
Other characters in Naji al-Ali's cartoons include a thin, miserable-looking man representing the Palestinian as the defiant victim of Israeli oppression and other hostile forces, and a fat man representing the Arab regimes and Palestinian political leaders who led an easy life and engaged in political compromises which the artist fervently opposed. The motifs of the Crucifixion (representing Palestinian suffering) and stone-throwing (representing the resistance of ordinary Palestinians) are also common in his work.

Assassination

It is still not known who opened fire on Naji al-Ali outside the London office of Kuwaiti newspaper Al Qabas in Ives Street on 22 July 1987. Naji al-Ali was subsequently taken to hospital and remained in a coma until his death on 29 August 1987. Although his will requested that he be buried in Ain al-Hilweh beside his father, this proved impossible to arrange and he was buried in Brookwood Islamic Cemetery outside London. British police arrested Ismail Sowan, a 28-year-old Jerusalem-born Palestinian researcher at Hull University, and found a cache of weapons in his apartment that they said were intended for terrorist attacks around Europe; he was only charged with possession of weapons and explosives. Initially, police said Sowan was a member of the PLO, though that organisation denied any involvement.

Sowan later confessed that he worked for both the PLO and the Israeli intelligence agency Mossad. A second suspect arrested by Scotland Yard also said he was a double agent. It was later revealed that Mossad had two double agents working in London-based PLO hit teams and had advance knowledge of the killing. By refusing to pass on the relevant information to their British counterparts, Mossad earned the displeasure of Britain, which retaliated by expelling three Israeli diplomats, one of whom was the embassy attache identified as the handler for the two agents. A furious Margaret Thatcher, then prime minister, closed Mossad’s London base in Palace Green, Kensington.The Daily Telegraph, London, April 5, 1998 The gun used in the murder,  a 7.62 Tokarev pistol, was found on the Hallfield Estate in Paddington by police, on 22 April 1989.

Force 17, acting under orders from Yasser Arafat, has also been claimed to be responsible for his assassination.

In August 2017, detectives relaunched an investigation into his murder case, 30 years after his death.

Commemorative statue

A statue of Naji al-Ali by the sculptor Charbel Faris was erected at the northern entrance of Ain al-Hilweh camp, where Naji was raised for most of his youth years.

Work on the fiberglass and colored polyester statue (with a steel inner support) took around five months. The statue holds a rock in its right hand and a booklet of drawings in the left hand.

Shortly after being completed, the statue was damaged in an explosion caused by unknown assailants; like al-Ali the statue was shot in the left eye.

The statue was repaired and re-erected.

Media

A movie was made about the life of Naji al-Ali in Egypt, with the Egyptian actor Nour El-Sherif playing the lead role.

See also
 Omaya Joha

References

Bibliography
 Kreitmeyr, Nadine (2012). Der Nahostkonflikt durch die Augen Hanzalas. Stereotypische Vorstellungen im Schaffen des Karikaturisten Naji al-'Ali. Berlin, Klaus Schwarz. 
 Farsoun, Samih K. (2004). Culture and Customs of the Palestinians. Greenwood Press. 
 Harlow, Barbara (1994). Writers and Assassinations. In Sidney J. Lemelle and Robin D. G. Kelley (Eds.). Imagining Home: Class, Culture and Nationalism in the African Diaspora (pp. 167–184). Verso. 
 Naji al-Ali, kamil al-turab al-falastini (Naji al-Ali, All Palestine's Soil''), Mahmud Abd Allah Kallam, Bisan lil-nashr w'al-tawzi' w'al-a'lam, Beirut, 2001.

External links
  extracts  from an interview with Radwa Ashour, during the summer of 1984 in Budapest. Published in Al-Ahram.
 Naji al-Ali: The timeless conscience of Palestine - Arjan El Fassed, The Electronic Intifada (22 July 2004)
 BBC ON THIS DAY webpage on Mr al-Ali's assassination.
 .

1930s births
1987 deaths
1987 murders in the United Kingdom
20th-century artists
1980s crimes in London
Palestinian cartoonists
Assassinated Palestinian people
Burials at Brookwood Cemetery
Palestinian people murdered abroad
People murdered in London
Deaths by firearm in London
Palestinian refugees
Palestinian expatriates in Kuwait
Palestinian expatriates in the United Kingdom
Palestinian caricaturists
Palestinian journalists
20th-century journalists